Cyphostemmin B is an oligostilbene found in Cyphostemma crotalarioides (Vitaceae). It is a resveratrol dimer.

References 

Resveratrol oligomers
Stilbenoid dimers